TVP3 Lublin is one of the regional branches of the TVP, Poland's public television broadcaster. It serves the entire Lublin Voivodeship.

External links 
 

Telewizja Polska
Television channels and stations established in 1985
Mass media in Lublin
1985 establishments in Poland